Al Hafirah may refer to:

Al Hafirah, Ha'il, Saudi Arabia
 Al Hafirah, Al Madinah, Saudi Arabia